Vladimir Yaroslavovich Klontsak (born 27 February 1968) is a Russian professional football coach and a former player.

Club career
As a player, he made his debut in the Soviet Second League in 1986 for FC Turbina Brezhnev. He played 6 games and scored 2 goals in the UEFA Intertoto Cup 1996 for FC KAMAZ Naberezhnye Chelny.

References

1968 births
People from Bugulma
Living people
Soviet footballers
Russian footballers
Association football defenders
FC Rubin Kazan players
FC KAMAZ Naberezhnye Chelny players
Russian Premier League players
FC Lokomotiv Nizhny Novgorod players
Russian football managers
FC KAMAZ Naberezhnye Chelny managers
FC Neftekhimik Nizhnekamsk players
Sportspeople from Tatarstan